Avison Young is a global commercial real estate services firm, headquartered in Toronto, with more than 100 offices in 15 countries. Avison Young was founded in 1978.

Services 
Avison Young offers commercial real estate services for occupiers and investors, including transaction, management, financial and advisory services.

History 
Formed by the union of Graeme Young & Associates of Alberta (1978) and Avison & Associates of Ontario (1989) and British Columbia (1994), Avison Young was created in 1996. Over the next decade, new offices opened in Toronto West (1997), Montreal (2002), Winnipeg and Regina (2004), Halifax (2006) and Ottawa (2007).  

The firm's Canadian offices merged into Avison Young (Canada) Inc. in 2008. Since then, Avison Young has grown from 11 Canadian offices and 293 professionals (including 53 principals) to 5,000 employees in more than 100 offices in 15 countries.

References 

Companies based in Toronto
Commercial real estate companies